Morettini is an Italian surname. Notable people with the surname include:

Marino Morettini (1931–1990), Italian cyclist
Mark Morettini (born 1962), American actor
Michele Morettini (born 1991), Italian cricketer

Italian-language surnames